This is a list of episodes from the third season of Columbo.

Broadcast history

The season originally aired Sundays at 8:30–10:00 pm (EST) as part of The NBC Sunday Mystery Movie.

DVD release
The season was released on DVD by Universal Pictures Home Entertainment.

Episodes

Columbo 03
1973 American television seasons
1974 American television seasons